Nautamlal Bhagavanji Mehta, or the Nagar Sheth of Jetpur (2 September 1879 – 2 September 1968) was an Indian independence activist and a supporter of Mahatma Gandhi. He was also a prominent businessman and a pioneer of the Gandhian Movement in what is now Gujarat. He is also believed to be the first to bestow the title "Mahatma" to Gandhi, not Rabindranath Tagore, as many believe. Mehta wrote a manpatra using the term, which has been authenticated by the National Gandhi Museum in New Delhi.  However there is a Genuine claim that the Peethadhipati of the Bhuvaneshwari Peeth in Gondal (Also called the Gondal Peeth) in Gujarat was the first person to bestow the title of Mahatma to Late Shri Mohandas Karamchand Gandhi, soon after he returned to India from South Africa. This can be verified from the present Pethadhipati of the Gondal Peeth.

References

Businesspeople in British India
Indian independence activists from Gujarat
People from Gujarat
1879 births
1968 deaths